Worth the Wait may refer to:

Albums
 Worth the Wait (EP), by Lindsay Ell, or the title song, 2017
 Worth the Wait, by Carnage the Executioner, 2011
 Worth the Wait, by Futrel, 1989
 Worth the Wait, by Norbotten Big Band, featuring Tim Hagans, 2007
 Worth the Wait, by Peaches & Herb, 1980
 Worth the Wait, a mixtape by Los, 2011
 Worth the Wait, an EP by Dozzi, 2019
 Worth the Wait, an EP by the Snails, 2013

Songs
 "Worth the Wait", by i:Scintilla from Dying and Falling, 2010
 "Worth the Wait", by Jordin Sparks from Jordin Sparks, 2007
 "Worth the Wait", by Kali Uchis from Red Moon in Venus, 2023
 "Worth the Wait", by KC Concepcion from KC, 2010
 "Worth the Wait", by We Are Scientists from With Love and Squalor, 2005

Other uses
 Worth the Wait, a group that competed on The Voice, American season 19, 2020
 Worth the Wait, a 2002 book by Jason Stevens
 Worth the Wait, a 2011 book by Jayson Stark